The 2005 MAC men's basketball tournament, a part of the 2004-05 NCAA Division I men's basketball season, took place from March 7–12 at Gund Arena in Cleveland.  Its winner received the Mid-American Conference's automatic bid to the 2005 NCAA tournament. It is a single-elimination tournament with four rounds and the three highest seeds received byes in the first round. All MAC teams were invited to participate. Miami, the MAC regular season winner, received the number one seed in the tournament. Fourth-seeded Ohio beat Miami in the semi-finals and defeated second-seeded Buffalo in overtime in the final. In the NCAA Ohio lost in the first round to Florida. Leon Williams of Ohio was named the tournament MVP.

Tournament

Seeds 
 Miami
 Toledo
 Western Michigan
 Ohio
 Kent State
 Akron
 Buffalo
 Bowling Green
 Ball State
 Northern Illinois
 Eastern Michigan
 Central Michigan
 Marshall

Bracket 

* – Denotes overtime period

First round

Quarterfinals

Semifinals

Finals

References 

Tournament
MAC men's basketball tournament
MAC men's basketball tournament
Mid-American Conference men's basketball tournament
Basketball in Cleveland